Canarium megalanthum is a tree in the family Burseraceae. The specific epithet  is from the Greek meaning "large flower".

Description
The grey bark is smooth to scaly.

Distribution and habitat
Canarium megalanthum grows naturally in Sumatra, Peninsular Malaysia and Borneo. Its habitat is mixed dipterocarp forest from sea-level to  altitude.

References

megalanthum
Trees of Sumatra
Trees of Peninsular Malaysia
Trees of Borneo
Plants described in 1926